The City of Santa Barbara Historic Landmarks consist of buildings and sites designated by the City of Santa Barbara, California, as historic landmarks. The city also maintains a list of Structures of Merit, a Historic Resources Inventory, and a list of designated and potential Historic Districts.

A map displaying the locations of Santa Barbara's designated historic landmarks can be viewed by clicking "OpenStreetMap" in the template found to the right below.

Santa Barbara Historic Landmarks
Landmarks highlighted in blue are also listed on the National Register of Historic Places.

See also
 National Register of Historic Places listings in Santa Barbara County, California
 California Historical Landmarks in Santa Barbara County, California

References

External links  
 Historic Preservation page at the City of Santa Barbara website

Santa Barbara
Santa Barbara
Santa Barbara
Santa Barbara